David Sime Cargill (9 April 1826 – 25 May 1904) was a Scottish businessman. He was the founder of Burmah Oil which expanded to become one of the United Kingdom's largest oil companies.

Life
He was born at Maryton, by Montrose, in Angus, Scotland, the son of James Cargill and his wife, Helen Thomson.

Cargill briefly worked in Glasgow in the offices of East India merchants William Milne & Co for whom, in 1844, he set sail for Ceylon to establish a branch of the company there. He became a local partner in Colombo in 1850. In 1861 Cargill returned to Glasgow to acquire the whole business which carried on an extensive trade with India as well as Ceylon. He remained chairman of Cargills in Ceylon until his death in 1904.

In 1872, he became a director of the Glasgow-based Rangoon Oil Company engaged in marketing oil products. Four years later he bought it outright and invested further funds but it was up against the monopoly of the Kingdom of Upper Burma which controlled oil exploration.
It was in 1886 that Cargill obtained exploration rights, as well as improving refining methods in Rangoon, and he founded Burmah Oil Ltd that year. David Sime Cargill greatly expanded business, eventually supplying 100% of Burma's oil and by-product requirements and 13% of India's kerosene requirements. He continued as chairman until his death in 1904 at home in Carruth, Bridge of Weir.

Cargill was also a director of the Merchants House of Glasgow, and of Glasgow Chamber of Commerce. He was a patron of the arts and became president of the city's Royal Institute of Fine Arts.

He died in Kilmacolm on 25 May 1904. He is buried with his first wife Margaret in the Glasgow Necropolis. Despite his wealth he has a small simple gravestone.

Family
He married Margaret Traill of Arbroath in 1861 and together they went on to have three sons and two daughters. Margaret died giving birth to David William Traill Cargill in 1872.

He married again in 1878 to Connel Elizabeth Auld and together they had one son and one daughter. His second son, John, succeeded him as chairman of Burmah Oil.

References

1826 births
1904 deaths
British businesspeople in the oil industry
Burmah-Castrol
BP people
People from Angus, Scotland
Scottish company founders
19th-century Scottish businesspeople
Burials at the Glasgow Necropolis